Dela Rosa station is a railway station located on the South Main Line in Makati, Metro Manila, Philippines.

Dela Rosa is the ninth station from Tutuban and is one of three PNR stations serving Makati, the other two being Pasay Road and EDSA.

Dela Rosa station is the replacement of Buendia station, which closed on September 7, 2017.

On August 1, 2018, Dela Rosa station became part of newly opened Caloocan shuttle line until September 10 when the line was extended to FTI railway station as the new terminus of the said line.

Nearby landmarks
The station is near the Cash & Carry Mall in Palanan and an SM Hypermarket in San Isidro, both across the Osmeña Highway. Further away from the station are Exportbank Plaza and the San Antonio, Pio Del Pilar and San Isidro national high schools. A cluster of Cityland condominiums is also located right behind the station.

Transportation links
Dela Rosa station is accessible by jeepneys and buses plying the Taft Avenue, Gil Puyat Avenue, and South Luzon Expressway routes. A tricycle terminal plying the adjacent San Antonio is located on Gil Puyat Avenue, while those plying Pio del Pilar also drop commuters off at the station.

The station is located roughly midway between Buendia MRT Station at the intersection with Epifanio de los Santos Avenue and Gil Puyat LRT Station at the intersection with Taft Avenue.

References

Philippine National Railways stations
Buildings and structures in Makati
Makati Central Business District
Railway stations in Metro Manila
Railway stations opened in 2017